Computer-aided process planning (CAPP) is the use of computer technology to aid in the process planning of a part or product, in manufacturing. 
 CAPP is the link between CAD and CAM in that it provides for the planning of the process to be used in producing a designed part.

Computer-aided process planning 

 CAPP is a link between the CAD and CAM modules. 
 Process planning is concerned with determining the sequence of individual manufacturing operations needed to produce a given part or product.
 The resulting operation sequence is documented on a form typically referred to as a " Route Sheet" (also called a process sheet/method sheet) containing a listing of the production operations and associated machine tools for a work part or assembly. 
 Process planning in manufacturing also refers to the planning of use of blanks, spare parts, packaging material, user instructions (manuals), etc.
 As the term "computer-aided production planning" is used in different contexts on different parts of the production process; to some extent, CAPP overlaps with the term "PIC" (production and inventory control).

As the design process is supported by many computer-aided tools, computer-aided process planning (CAPP) has evolved to simplify and improve process planning and achieve more effective use of manufacturing resources.

Process Planning is of two types:

 Generative type computer-aided process planning.
 Variant type process planning.

Routings that specify operations, operation sequences, work centers, standards, tooling, and fixtures. This routing becomes a major input to the manufacturing resource planning system to define operations for production activity control purposes and define required resources for capacity requirements planning purposes.

Computer-aided process planning initially evolved as a means to electronically store a process plan once it was created, retrieve it, modify it for a new part and print the plan.

Other capabilities were table-driven cost and standard estimating systems, for sales representatives to create customer quotations and estimate delivery time.

Future development 
Generative or dynamic CAPP is the main focus of development, the ability to automatically generate production plans for new products, or dynamically update production plans on the basis of resource availability. Generative CAPP will probably use iterative methods, where simple production plans are applied to automatic CAD/CAM development to refine the initial production plan.

A Generative CAPP system was developed at Beijing No. 1 Machine Tool Plant (BYJC) in Beijing, China as part of a UNDP project (DG/CRP/87/027) from 1989 to 1995.  The project was reported in "Machine Design Magazine; New Trends" May 9, 1994, P.22-23.  The system was demonstrated to the CASA/SME Leadership in Excellence for Applications Development (LEAD) Award committee in July 1995.  The committee awarded BYJC the LEAD Award in 1995 for this achievement.   In order to accomplish Generative CAPP, modifications were made to the CAD, PDM, ERP, and CAM systems.   In addition, a Manufacturing Execution System (MES) was built to handle the scheduling of tools, personnel, supply, and logistics, as well as maintain shop floor production capabilities.

Generative CAPP systems are built on a factory's production capabilities and capacities.  In Discrete Manufacturing, Art-to-Part validations have been performed often, but when considering highly volatile engineering designs, and multiple manufacturing operations with multiple tooling options, the decisions tables become longer and the vector matrices more complex.  BYJC builds CNC machine tools and Flexible Manufacturing Systems (FMS) to customer specifications.  Few are duplicates.  The Generative CAPP System is based on the unique capabilities and capacities needed to produce those specific products at BYJC.  Unlike a Variant Process Planning system that modifies existing plans, each process plan could be defined automatically, independent of past routings.  As improvements are made to production efficiencies, the improvements are automatically incorporated into the current production mix.  This generative system is a key component of the CAPP system for the Agile Manufacturing environment.

In order to achieve the Generative CAPP system, components were built to meet needed capabilities:

Shop floor manufacturing abilities of BYJC were defined.  It was determined that there are 46 major operations and 84 dependent operations the shop floor could execute to produce the product mix.   These operations are manufacturing primitive operations.   As new manufacturing capabilities are incorporated into the factory's repertoire, they need to be accommodated in the spectrum of operations.
These factory operations are then used to define the features for the Feature Based Design extensions that are incorporated into the CAD system.
The combination of these feature extensions and the parametric data associated with them became part of the data that is passed from the CAD system to the modified PDM system as the data set content for the specific product, assembly, or part.
The ERP system was modified to handle the manufacturing abilities for each tool on the shop floor.  This is an extension to the normal feeds and speeds that the ERP system has the capability of maintaining about each tool.  In addition, personnel records are also enhanced to note special characteristics, talents, and education of each employee should it become relevant in the manufacturing process.
A Manufacturing Execution System (MES) was created.  The MES's major component is an expert/artificial intelligent system that matches the engineering feature objects from the PDM system against the tooling, personnel, material, transportation needs, etc. needed to manufacture them in the ERP system.   Once physical components are identified, the items are scheduled.  The scheduling is continuously updated based on the real time conditions of the enterprise.  Ultimately, the parameters for this system were based on:

a. Expenditures
b.	Time
c.	Physical dimensions
d.	Availability

The parameters are used to produce multidimensional differential equations.  Solving the partial differential equations will produce the optimum process and production planning at the time when the solution was generated.   Solutions had the flexibility to change over time based on the ability to satisfy agile manufacturing criteria.  Execution planning can be dynamic and accommodate changing conditions.

The system allows new products to be brought on line quickly based on their manufacturability.  The more sophisticated CAD/CAM, PDM and ERP systems have the base work already incorporated into them for Generative Computer Aided Process Planning.  The task of building and implementing the MES system still requires identifying the capabilities that exist within a given establishment, and exploiting them to the fullest potential. The system created is highly specific, the concepts can be extrapolated to other enterprises.

Traditional CAPP methods that optimize plans in a linear manner have not been able to satisfy the need for flexible planning, so new dynamic systems will explore all possible combinations of production processes, and then generate plans according to available machining resources. For example, K.S. Lee et al. states that "By considering the multi-selection tasks simultaneously, a specially designed genetic algorithm searches through the entire solution space to identify the optimal plan".

See also
 CAD, (computer-aided design)
 CAM, (computer-aided manufacturing)
 CIM, (computer-integrated manufacturing)

References 

Product lifecycle management
Workflow technology
Information technology management
Industrial computing